The Department of Airports (DOA) is a Thai government department under the Ministry of Transport. It operates 28 civil airports throughout the country. The department was split off from the Department of Civil Aviation in 2015, part of a restructuring response to ICAO's downgrading of Thailand's aviation safety rating. The other agency that previously formed part of the old department is the Civil Aviation Authority of Thailand.

Operations
Only 17 DOA airports turned a profit between 2009 and 2016 while the total number of passengers jumped 25 percent. In 2018, DOA's revenues from its 28 airports was 853 million baht. Krabi airport alone contributed 469 million baht. Udon Thani is also in the black, with profits reaching 100 million baht a year.

Airports of Thailand PCL (AOT) had planned to assume management of Udon Thani International Airport, Sakon Nakhon Airport, Tak Airport, and Chumphon Airport in 2019. The DOA would relinquish control, reducing the airports under its control to 24. In a change of plans in August 2019, AOT proposed instead to take control of the Udon Thani, Tak, Buriram, and Krabi airports, leaving Sakon Nakhon and Chumphon airports to the DOA. DOA insists that the earlier plan be followed as it would retain its money-making airports.

List of airports

Northern Thailand
Lampang Airport
Mae Hong Son Airport
Mae Sot Airport
Nan Nakhon Airport
Pai Airport
Phetchabun Airport
Phitsanulok Airport
Phrae Airport
Tak Airport

Northeastern Thailand
Buriram Airport
Khon Kaen Airport
Loei Airport
Nakhon Phanom Airport
Nakhon Ratchasima Airport
Roi Et Airport
Sakon Nakhon Airport
Ubon Ratchathani Airport
Udon Thani International Airport

Southern Thailand
Betong Airport
Chumphon Airport
Hua Hin Airport
Krabi International Airport
Nakhon Si Thammarat Airport
Narathiwat Airport
Pattani Airport
Ranong Airport
Surat Thani International Airport
Trang Airport

Third Bangkok airport
In mid-2019, the DOA proposed the construction of a new airport in Nakhon Pathom Province to relieve pressure on Bangkok's Don Mueang and Suvarnabhumi airports (both controlled by Airports of Thailand PCL). 
The 20 billion baht airport, to occupy 3,500 rai straddling the Bang Len and Nakhon Chai Si districts, 50 kilometres west of Bangkok. Its capacity would be 25 million passengers per year. If approved, construction would start in 2023 and the airport would be operational by 2025 or 2026.

References

Airports
Civil aviation in Thailand
Airport operators
Ministry of Transport (Thailand)